Tehran Provincial League, formerly known as Tehran Clubs Championship, is the premier football league of Tehran Province and is 5th in the Iranian football pyramid after the 3rd Division. It is part of AFC's Vision Asia program.

Stablished in 1920, it is the oldest football league still being held in Iran. Tehran Clubs Championship used to be Tehran's and Iran's top flight until 1973 when Takht Jamshid Cup was established for the first time. During the 1970s Tehran clubs championship lost its importance and almost all of Tehran's top club participated in Takjt Jamshid Cup.

The Iranian revolution in 1979 put a stop to all football leagues and cups in Iran for a season and 1979–80 season was left unfinished to crowd violence in a friendly match between Tehran's greatest rivals Esteghlal and Persepolis. In the 1980s due to the Iran-Iraq War no national league was held until the end of the war in 1988 and, as a result, Tehran clubs championship again was Iran's and Tehran's top flight and almost all of the stars of Iranian football and members of Team Melli played in this league.

The 1990-91 season was the last season that Tehran's top clubs participated in this league and the next season they joined the newly established Azadegan League and hence Tehran clubs championship faded away and turned to 4th level of Iranian football pyramid and later on with the establishment of Iranian pro league in the 2001-02 season to the 5th level of Iranian football pyramid.

History
Stablished in 1920, when for the first time there was a football competition in Persia, for the first decade, the cup consisted of a few Iranian clubs including Iran Club, Bank Shahi and an English club of British expats living in Tehran. in 1930s, Iran's most successful team was Tofan and in the 1940 Shahin and Daraei emerged as new rivals for Tofan, In 1946 Tehran’s cycling club established a football team, which changed its name to Taj in 1949 and replaced Ṭofan as one of Tehran’s top three clubs.

Prior to this year no national league was held in Iran and each province of Iran had a separate local league for themselves and football clubs from Tehran used to participate in this league. For more than half a century Iran's and Tehran's most important clubs including Taj, Shahin, Daraei among others had a fierce rivalry over dominance of Tehran Clubs Championship which ended in dissolution of Shahin and Daraei in 1967 and 1968 respectively.

In the 1980s and due to Iran - Iraq war no national championship was held in Iran so Tehran provincial football league was the most important event in Iranian football calendar.

Champions

First Tier

Second Tier

First Tier

Third Tier

Fifth Tier

References

Sport in Tehran Province
5